Shwe Nyaung is located in southern Shan state of Myanmar (formerly Burma). It is near Taunggyi (12 miles ) and also Nyaung Shwe ( 7 miles).

Populated places in Taunggyi District
Shan State